Mount Schevill is a conspicuous mountain, 1,995 m, overlooking the head of Somero Glacier, about 5 nautical miles (9 km) southeast of Mount Johnstone, in the Queen Maud Mountains. Named by Advisory Committee on Antarctic Names (US-ACAN) for William E. Schevill, United States Antarctic Research Program (USARP) biologist at McMurdo Station, 1964–65.

Mountains of the Ross Dependency
Amundsen Coast